Bromisoval (INN), commonly known as bromovalerylurea, is a hypnotic and sedative of the bromoureide group discovered by Knoll in 1907 and patented in 1909.  It is marketed  over the counter in Asia under various trade names (such as Brovarin), usually in combination with nonsteroidal anti-inflammatory drugs.

Chronic use of bromisoval has been associated with bromine poisoning.

Bromisoval can be prepared by bromination of isovaleric acid by the Hell-Volhard-Zelinsky reaction followed by reaction with urea.

See also
 Acecarbromal
 Carbromal
 Apronal

References

Hypnotics
Sedatives
Organobromides
GABAA receptor positive allosteric modulators